Champeta, el ritmo de la Tierra is an upcoming Colombian comedy-drama streaming television series for children and adolescents, which is produced by Vista Productions for The Walt Disney Company. In Latin America, the ten-part first season of the series is expected to be released on Disney+.

Plot 
Fatimah and Duma come from two completely different worlds. Near the Colombian Caribbean coast, the two young people fall in love while dancing Champeta together in the streets of Barrio de la Bahía. Not far away also lives Elías, an enigmatic elderly man who knows about the mysterious power emanating from the rhythm of the local champetas. Chosen by this ancient power of the earth, Fatimah and Duma receive supernatural powers which they awaken when their feet touch the ground to the rhythm of the champeta. This power was given to the two to save the earth from a powerful and ruthless corporation that not only harms the environment, but also threatens the lives of all beings. Together with their friends and allies, Fatimah and Duma develop their skills and fight together for the preservation of Barrio de la Bahía and the whole of the earth.

Cast 
 Daniela Trujillo as Fatimah
 Keyller de la Hoz as Duma
 Marlon Moreno as Elías
 Bárbara Perea as Alma
 Mr Black El Presidente as Chamo
 Angely Gaviria as Luz
 Johann Vera as Michael
 Sergio Herrera as Alexander
 Allison Vega as Majo
 Danharry Colorado as Ronnie
 Blanca Palacio as Vera
 Julián Calderón as Pipa
 Jean Carlo Posada as Don Orlando
 Sebastian González as Emiliano
 Rafael Novoa as Eduardo
 James Vargas as old Man
 Cristian Vargas as Pedro
 Ricardo Vélez as César Osorio
 Carolina Angarita as Verónica

Episodes

References

External links 
 Press release on the series on Disney PressPack
 

Comedy-drama television series
Television shows filmed in Colombia
2020s Colombian television series
Spanish-language television shows
Disney+ original programming
Upcoming television series